George Shearing in Dixieland is a 1988 album by jazz pianist George Shearing of music associated with Dixieland.

Reception

Scott Yanow reviewed the album for Allmusic and wrote that "This promising effort is a major disappointment. ...Shearing planned to revisit his roots in Dixieland and swing but he hedged his bets. Despite having an impressive septet...Shearing wrote out most of the ensembles, taking away from the spontaneity and potential excitement of the music. Despite the interesting repertoire (ranging from "Truckin'," "Honeysuckle Rose" and "Jazz Me Blues" to "Take Five," "Desafinado" and even a Dixiefied "Lullaby Of Birdland"), this date falls far short of its potential".

Track listing 
 "Clap Yo' Hands" (George Gershwin, Ira Gershwin) – 3:55
 "Mighty Like the Blues" (Leonard Feather) – 2:45
 "Truckin'" (Rube Bloom, Ted Koehler) – 3:57
 "Fascinating Rhythm" (G. Gershwin, I. Gershwin) – 3:10
 "Destination Moon" (Roy Alfred, Marvin Fisher) – 4:49
 "New Orleans" (Hoagy Carmichael) – 3:27
 "Soon" (G. Gershwin, I. Gershwin) – 3:11
 "Take Five" (Paul Desmond) – 3:23
 "Lullaby of Birdland" (George Shearing, George David Weiss) – 4:19
 "Jazz Me Blues" (Tom Delaney) – 3:38
 "Blue Monk" (Thelonious Monk) – 7:00
 "Desafinado" (Antônio Carlos Jobim, Newton Mendonça) – 4:12
 "Honeysuckle Rose" (Andy Razaf, Fats Waller) – 3:33
 "Alice In Dixieland" – 8:39

Personnel 
George Shearing – piano
Kenny Davern – clarinet
Warren Vaché – cornet
Ken Peplowski – tenor saxophone
George Masso – trombone 
Neil Swainson – double bass
Jerry Fuller – drums
Production
Phil Edwards – engineer
Leonard Feather – liner notes
George Horn – mastering
Carl Jefferson – producer
Sandi Young – art direction
Ollie Cotton, Stan Wallace – assistant engineer
Michael McDonald – engineer, remixing

References

1988 albums
Albums produced by Carl Jefferson
Concord Records albums
George Shearing albums